Seyed Abulhassan Navab  (born 1958 in Shareza, Isfahan) is an Iranian professor and cleric who currently serves as chancellor of the University of Religions and Denominations. He was one of the candidates for the 2008 parliamentary election, but his candidacy was withdrawn two months before the election.

References

1958 births
Living people
Shia clerics from Isfahan